Georg Sabinus or Georg Schuler (23 April 1508 – 2 December 1560) was a German poet, diplomat and academic.

Sabinus was born at Brandenburg an der Havel.  He served as Professor of Poetry and Eloquence and first-ever rector of the Albertina (later the University of Königsberg).  He died, aged 52, in Frankfurt (Oder).

References

 Petrus Albinus: Vita Georgii Sabini Brandenbvrgensis, ic., Poetæ laureati, et comitis Palatini in aula Lateranensi, Consiliarij Illustrissimorum Marchionum Brandenburgensium, [et] ad diuersos proceres Legati, Professoris Eloquentiæ in Acad. Francofordiana ad Viadrum, Viri summi [et] clarissimi / Consignata potissimum ex ipsius scriptis a Petro Albino Niuemontio. Wittenberg : Welack, 1588; erw. kommentierte Ausg. hrsg. von Theodor Crusius. Liegnitz : Rorlach, 1724
 Otto Amdohr: Zwei Elegien des Frankfurter Rektors Georg Sabinus : übersetzt und mit einer historischen Abhandlung versehen. Frankfurt a.O. : Friedrichs-Gymnasium, Festschrift 1894, S. 129 - 153
 Adolf Fürstenhaupt: Georg Sabinus, der Sänger der Hohenzoller'schen Dynastie : eine litterargeschichtliche Skizze im Rahmen des Sechszehnten Jahrhunderts. Berlin : Gebauer, 1849
 Moritz Wilhelm Heffter: Erinnerung an Georg Sabinus, den trefflichen Dichter, akademischen Lehrer und Diplomaten, den Mitstifter der Universität zu Königsberg in Preussen. Leipzig : Weigel, 1844
 Walther Hubatsch unter Mitarbeit von Iselin Gundermann: Die Albertus-Universität zu Königsberg/Preußen in Bildern. Würzburg 1966; 2. Aufl. - Nachdruck der Ausgabe Duderstadt: Mecke 1993
 Heinz Scheible: Georg Sabinus (1508 - 1560) : ein Poet als Gründungsrektor. Erstdr. in: Die Albertus-Universität zu Königsberg und ihre Professoren. Berlin, 1995, S. 17 - 31; ebenfalls in: Melanchthon und die Reformation. Mainz : von Zabern, 1996, S. [533] - 547
 Max Töppen: Die Gründung der Universität zu Königsberg und das Leben ihres ersten Rectors Georg Sabinus. Königsberg : Verlag der Universitätsbuchhandlung, 1844
 Johannes Voigt: Mittheilungen aus der Correspondenz des Herzogs Albrecht von Preussen mit Martin Luther, Philipp Melanchthon und Georg Sabinus : ein Nachtrag zum Briefwechsel der berühmtesten Gelehrten des Zeitalters der Reformation mit Herzog Albrecht von Preussen. Königsberg : Bornträger, 1841
 

1508 births
1560 deaths
People from Brandenburg an der Havel
People from the Margraviate of Brandenburg
German poets
Writers from Brandenburg
German diplomats
Academic staff of the University of Königsberg
German male poets